Shams Ur Rehman Alavi is a journalist from Madhya Pradesh, India.  He works with Hindustan Times and also writes for various publications like Firstpost, The Wire, and Huffington Post. He has widely written on crime, especially Chambal bandits, leftist militancy, and organised crime.  He also writes on Muslim issues and communal harmony. He works for Bhopal edition of the Hindustan Times.

References

 "Ten year reign of terror cut short," Arts, Hindustan Times, 17 April 2007, page 1

External links
 An Indian Muslim - blog by the author
 Twitter

Hindustan Times journalists
Indian Muslims
Writers from Bhopal
Living people
Journalists from Madhya Pradesh
Indian male journalists
Year of birth missing (living people)